Rinodina is a large genus of lichens in the family Physciaceae. , Index Fungorum lists 132 species in the genus but the Global Biodiversity Information Facility lists 275 species. This list is based on the number 132 from Index Fungorum and so many potential species are omitted.

A
 Rinodina aequata 
 Rinodina alba 
 Rinodina albertana 
 Rinodina argopsina 
 Rinodina arnoldii 
 Rinodina arthomelina 
 Rinodina asperata 
 Rinodina aspersa 
 Rinodina atrocinerea 
 Rinodina atrofuscata 
 Rinodina aurantiaca 
 Rinodina australiensis 
 Rinodina austroborealis 
 Rinodina austroleprosa

B

 Rinodina badiexcipula 
 Rinodina beccariana 
 Rinodina biloculata 
 Rinodina bischoffii 
 Rinodina blastidiata 
 Rinodina boulderensis 
 Rinodina brasiliensis 
 Rinodina brattii 
 Rinodina brauniana 
 Rinodina brodoana 
 Rinodina buckii 
 Rinodina bullata

C

 Rinodina calcarea 
 Rinodina californiensis 
 Rinodina campestris 
 Rinodina candidogrisea 
 Rinodina capeverdeana 
 Rinodina chrysidiata 
 Rinodina citrinisidiata 
 Rinodina colobina 
 Rinodina colobinoides 
 Rinodina compensata 
 Rinodina confragosa 
 Rinodina confragosula 
 Rinodina confusa 
 Rinodina conradii 
 Rinodina cryptolecanorina

D
 Rinodina degeliana 
 Rinodina densisidiata 
 Rinodina diminutiva 
 Rinodina dolichospora

E
 Rinodina efflorescens 
 Rinodina elixii 
 Rinodina endospora 
 Rinodina ericina 
 Rinodina etayoi 
 Rinodina evae 
 Rinodina exigua

F
 Rinodina fijiensis 
 Rinodina filsonii 
 Rinodina fimbriata 
 Rinodina flavosoralifera 
 Rinodina fuscoisidiata

G

 Rinodina galapagoensis 
 Rinodina gennarii 
 Rinodina graciliforminica 
 Rinodina grandilocularis 
 Rinodina griseosoralifera 
 Rinodina gustafmalmei 
 Rinodina gyrophorica

H
 Rinodina herteliana 
 Rinodina hypobadia

I
 Rinodina immersa 
 Rinodina imshaugii 
 Rinodina incurva 
 Rinodina innata 
 Rinodina inspersoparietata 
 Rinodina interpolata 
 Rinodina isabelina 
 Rinodina isidioides

J
 Rinodina juniperina

K
 Rinodina kozukensins

L

 Rinodina laevigata 
 Rinodina lignicola 
 Rinodina lindingeri 
 Rinodina lobulata 
 Rinodina luridata  
 Rinodina luridescens

M

 Rinodina macrospora 
 Rinodina maronisidiata 
 Rinodina megistospora 
 Rinodina michaelae 
 Rinodina milvina 
 Rinodina milvinodes 
 Rinodina mniaroea
 Rinodina moziana 
 Rinodina murrayi

N
 Rinodina notabilis 
 Rinodina nugrae

O

 Rinodina obscura 
 Rinodina occulta 
 Rinodina oleae 
 Rinodina orientalis 
 Rinodina oxneriana 
 Rinodina oxydatella

P
 Rinodina pacifica 
 Rinodina pallidescens 
 Rinodina parasitica 
 Rinodina peloleuca 
 Rinodina perreagens 
 Rinodina pityrea 
 Rinodina placynthielloides 
 Rinodina pluriloculata 
 Rinodina polymorphospora 
 Rinodina polyspora 
 Rinodina punctosorediata 
 Rinodina pyrina

R
 Rinodina ramboldii 
 Rinodina roboris

S
 Rinodina sicula 
 Rinodina siouxiana 
 Rinodina sophodes 
 Rinodina striatitunicata 
 Rinodina subbadioatra 
 Rinodina subcrustacea  
 Rinodina substellulata

T
 Rinodina tasmanica 
 Rinodina teichophila 
 Rinodina teniswoodiorum 
 Rinodina terricola 
 Rinodina thiomela 
 Rinodina tibellii 
 Rinodina turfacea 
 Rinodina turfaceoides

U
 Rinodina unica

V
 Rinodina verruciformis

W
 Rinodina wetmorei 
 Rinodina williamsii

X
 Rinodina xanthomelana

References

Rinodina
Rinodina